Clarence Hector Woodfield (9 April 1901 – 14 April 1968) was an Australian rules footballer who played with Essendon and South Melbourne in the Victorian Football League (VFL).

Notes

External links 

1901 births
1968 deaths
Australian rules footballers from Victoria (Australia)
Essendon Football Club players
Sydney Swans players